Ljubinko Veselinović (born 17 September 1948) is a Serbian boxer. He competed in the men's light welterweight event at the 1968 Summer Olympics.

References

1948 births
Living people
Serbian male boxers
Olympic boxers of Yugoslavia
Boxers at the 1968 Summer Olympics
Sportspeople from Belgrade
Mediterranean Games silver medalists for Yugoslavia
Mediterranean Games medalists in boxing
Competitors at the 1967 Mediterranean Games
Light-welterweight boxers